Sheldon "Shay" Haley (born December 18, 1975), also known as Shade, is an American drummer, rapper, singer, songwriter, and record producer. He is a member of the funk rock band N*E*R*D, alongside fellow Virginia musicians Pharrell Williams and Chad Hugo. His role in the band is often questioned, but in a 2010 interview, Williams stated that Haley is "the root of the band" and "[Haley] keeps everyone grounded and together."

Personal life 
In November 2010, he married Jackie Garcia, the former girlfriend of murdered NFL Safety Sean Taylor and niece of actor Andy Garcia.

References

External links 
N*E*R*D official site

American rock drummers
Living people
American rock musicians
African-American drummers
N.E.R.D. members
1972 births
20th-century American drummers
American male drummers
21st-century American drummers